Ralsko is a town in Česká Lípa District in the Liberec Region of the Czech Republic. It has about 2,100 inhabitants. It comprises area of the former military training area with Hradčany Air Base.

Because of the former military area, the town's municipal territory is the fourth largest in the country, after the cities of Prague, Brno and Ostrava.

Administrative parts
The town is made up of town parts and villages of Boreček, Horní Krupá, Hradčany, Hvězdov, Jabloneček, Kuřívody, Náhlov, Ploužnice and Svébořice. The municipal office is located in Kuřívody.

Geography
It lies in the Ralsko Uplands. The Ploučnice River shortly crosses the municipal territory in the northeast. There are several ponds in the area, the largest of them are Hradčanský and Novodvorský.

History
The oldest part of Ralsko is Kuřívody. The first written mention of Kuřívody is from 1279, it was founded between 1264 and 1278 by Ottokar II of Bohemia as a royal town. Due to lack of water, it remained a small town throughout its existence.

Before 1945, there was more than 7,000 inhabitants in today's Ralsko area. At the beginning of 1945, Hradčany Air Base was built by German army. After the World War II, the German majority was expelled.

In 1950, the Ralsko military training area was established. In 1992, it was abolished and the municipality of Ralsko was established. In 2006, Ralsko became a town.

Ralsko military training area
Between 1946 and 1950, the inhabitants were relocated to establish a military training area in surroundings of the Ralsko mountain. The displacement of the population was completed on 31 October 1952. More than 3,000 inhabitants were evicted from the villages.

The Ralsko Mountain and the airfield were used as a military weapons-testing area for decades. After the Prague Spring of 1968, the installation was manned by Soviet Troops. In the late 1980s the Soviet 442nd Missile Brigade stationed SS-21 short-range tactical missiles at Hvězdov. It 1988, there was more than 20,000 permanent Soviet inhabitants (soldiers and their families) in the area. After the collapse of the Soviet Union in 1990–91 the missiles were withdrawn and the entire weapons-testing area was closed off.

Demographics

Sights

Many of the discarded Czech and Soviet munitions were collected and are now on display at a little museum in Kuřívody. Only recently has the former military training area been opened as a natural reserve. On the Ralsko mountain there is a ruin of a Gothic castle. It has been desolate since the 16th century.

There is a Renaissance castle in Kuřívody, formerly a fortress.

References

External links

Cities and towns in the Czech Republic
Populated places in Česká Lípa District